Kamiyasu Station is a HRT station on Astram Line, located in 2-30-10, Kamiyasu, Asaminami-ku, Hiroshima.

Platforms

Connections
█ Astram Line
●Yasuhigashi — ●Kamiyasu — ●Takatori

Around station
Bus terminal
Hiroshima Kamiyasu Post Office
Hiroshima City Asa Zoological Park
Hiroshima City Manga Library Asa Reading Room

History
March 14, 1991: During the Astram Line's construction, 15 people are killed when a girder supporting the line's elevated guideway collapsed.
August 20, 1994: Station opens.

See also
Astram Line
Hiroshima Rapid Transit

References

Kamiyasu Station